Banpo is an archaeological site in Xi'an, China

Banpo may also refer to:

Banpo-dong, a dong, neighbourhood of Seocho-gu in Seoul, South Korea
Banpo Station, subway station in Jamwon-dong, Seoul, South Korea
Banpo Bridge, a bridge over the Han River, South Korea.
Banpo symbols, found at Banpo archaeological site
Bön-po or Bön-pa: a member of the Bön Religion.